Svetlaya is a rural locality (a village) in Kirillovsky Selsoviet, Ufimsky District, Bashkortostan, Russia. The population was 93 as of 2010. There are 9 streets.

Geography 
Svetlaya is located 29 km east of Ufa (the district's administrative centre) by road. Shaksha is the nearest rural locality.

References 

Rural localities in Ufimsky District